The Cipotegato is a tradition of Tarazona that takes place each year on August the 27th at 12 am. The festivities in honor of the patron Saint Atilano, were declared of Regional Interest in 1998 and National Interest in 2009. Turasionense mythical character hooded and dressed as harlequin with the colors yellow, red and green. The main day of the fiestas of Tarazona, exactly at noon, he stepped into the square through an open corridor through the crowd of friends and former Cipotegatos. Crossing the square, is pursued by the crowd that throws tomatoes. If he comes out victorious, it will be uploaded to the sculpture erected in his honor at the square. The Cipotegato is elected annually by drawing lots among the youth population.

History 
Tarazona had an annual tradition where, during fiestas, a prisoner from the local prison was given an opportunity to win freedom. The prisoner was given a stick with a string that ended in a ball (similar to what the Cipotegato currently carries), and was instructed that if he could leave the town was he would be free. The prisoner was then released in the middle of the town square, where the townsfolk would pelt the prisoner with stones as the prisoner attempted to escape the town.

See also 
Fiestas of National Tourist Interest of Spain

External links 
"Rain of tomato for the Cipotegato" Heraldo.es

Aragonese culture
Festivals in Spain
Tarazona
Tourist attractions in Aragon